The BAFTA Award for Best Screenplay is a British Academy Film Award for the best script. It was awarded from 1968 to 1982. In 1983 it was split into BAFTA Award for Best Original Screenplay and BAFTA Award for Best Adapted Screenplay.

1960s
 1968: The Graduate – Calder Willingham and Buck Henry
 if.... – David Sherwin
 The Lion in Winter – James Goldman
 1969: Midnight Cowboy – Waldo Salt
 Goodbye, Columbus – Arnold Schulman
 Women in Love – Larry Kramer
 Z – Costa-Gavras, Jorge Semprún

1970s
 1970: Butch Cassidy and the Sundance Kid – William Goldman
 Bob & Carol & Ted & Alice – Paul Mazursky and Larry Tucker
 Kes – Barry Hines, Ken Loach, and Tony Garnett
 They Shoot Horses, Don't They? – James Poe and Robert E. Thompson
 1971: The Go-Between – Harold Pinter
 Gumshoe – Neville Smith
 Sunday Bloody Sunday – Penelope Gilliatt
 Taking Off – Miloš Forman, John Guare, Jean-Claude Carrière, and Jon Klein
 1972: The Hospital – Paddy Chayefsky / The Last Picture Show – Larry McMurtry and Peter Bogdanovich (TIE)
 Cabaret – Jay Presson Allen
 A Clockwork Orange – Stanley Kubrick
 1973: The Discreet Charm of the Bourgeoisie – Luis Buñuel and Jean-Claude Carrière
 The Day of the Jackal – Kenneth Ross
 Sleuth – Anthony Shaffer
 A Touch of Class – Melvin Frank and Jack Rose
 1974: Chinatown – Robert Towne / The Last Detail – Robert Towne (TIE)
 Blazing Saddles – Mel Brooks, Norman Steinberg, Andrew Bergman, Richard Pryor, and Alan Uger
 The Conversation – Francis Ford Coppola
 Lacombe, Lucien – Louis Malle and Patrick Modiano
 1975: Alice Doesn't Live Here Anymore – Robert Getchell
 Dog Day Afternoon – Frank Pierson
 Jaws – Peter Benchley and Carl Gottlieb
 Nashville – Joan Tewkesbury
 1976: Bugsy Malone – Alan Parker
 All the President's Men – William Goldman
 One Flew Over the Cuckoo's Nest – Bo Goldman and Lawrence Hauben
 The Sunshine Boys – Neil Simon
 1977: Annie Hall – Woody Allen and Marshall Brickman
 Equus – Peter Shaffer
 Network – Paddy Chayefsky
 Rocky – Sylvester Stallone
 1978: Julia – Alvin Sargent
 Close Encounters of the Third Kind – Steven Spielberg
 The Goodbye Girl – Neil Simon
 A Wedding – John Considine, Patricia Resnick, Allan F. Nicholls, and Robert Altman
 1979: Manhattan – Woody Allen and Marshall Brickman
 The China Syndrome – Mike Gray, T. S. Cook, and James Bridges
 The Deer Hunter – Deric Washburn
 Yanks – Colin Welland and Walter Bernstein

1980s
 1980: Being There – Jerzy Kosiński
 Airplane! – Jim Abrahams, David Zucker, and Jerry Zucker
 The Elephant Man – Christopher De Vore, Eric Bergren, and David Lynch
 Kramer vs. Kramer – Robert Benton
 1981: Gregory's Girl – Bill Forsyth
 Atlantic City – John Guare
 Chariots of Fire – Colin Welland
 The French Lieutenant's Woman – Harold Pinter
 1982: Missing – Costa-Gavras and Donald E. Stewart
 E.T. the Extra-Terrestrial – Melissa Mathison
 Gandhi – John Briley
 On Golden Pond – Ernest Thompson

External links
 

British Academy Film Awards
 
Screenwriting awards for film